The NV5 Invitational is a golf tournament on the Korn Ferry Tour. It was first played as the Evans Scholars Invitational in May 2019 at The Glen Club in Glenview, Illinois.  As part of COVID-19-related schedule changes to the Korn Ferry Tour season, the tournament was postponed to September 2020, and the location was changed to Chicago Highlands Club. In 2021 the tournament returned to May and to The Glen Club.

Winners

Bolded golfers graduated to the PGA Tour via the Korn Ferry Tour regular-season money list.

References

External links

Coverage on the Korn Ferry Tour's official site

Korn Ferry Tour events
Golf in Illinois
Recurring sporting events established in 2019
2019 establishments in Illinois